Eamonn Murray is a Gaelic footballer.

Manager 
He led Meath when they won the 2022 All Ireland Senior Ladies' Football title. Murray also got them promoted into the Division 1 and Division 2 leagues. Murray led Meath to the top from the Intermediate class. Meath had knocked out Dublin in 2021. He comes from Gowna and criticized the AFLW. He said that the loss of players to the AFLW was why he cried after the 2022 final. He hopes it helps Kerry make a breakthrough.

Murray resigned as Meath manager at the end of August 2022. He said he had been thinking about doing so since the All-Ireland final had ended.

References

Year of birth missing (living people)
Living people
Ladies' Gaelic football managers